The 2015 Lockdown (also known as Impact Wrestling: Lockdown) was a professional wrestling television special produced by Total Nonstop Action Wrestling (TNA). The show took place on January 9, 2015 at the Manhattan Center in New York, New York. It was the eleventh event under the Lockdown chronology. Unlike the previous events, this event was not held on pay-per-view (PPV) and instead, was featured as a special edition of TNA's weekly broadcast of Impact Wrestling on Destination America.

Five professional wrestling matches were contested at the event. The main event was a Lethal Lockdown match, in which Team Angle (Kurt Angle, Austin Aries, Gunner and Lashley) defeated The Beat Down Clan (MVP, Kenny King, Samoa Joe and Low Ki). All the matches at the event were contested under the steel cage in the six-sided ring dubbed the "Six Sides of Steel matches".

Event

Preliminary matches
The event kicked off with a Six Sides of Steel match, in which The Revolution (Abyss and James Storm) defended the World Tag Team Championship against The Hardys (Jeff Hardy and Matt Hardy). Near the end of the match, Khoya pulled Storm out of the cage through a hole and then Jeff tried to climb the cage after delivering a Twist of Fate to Abyss but Sanada spit mist on him, allowing Storm to hit a Last Call to Jeff to retain the titles. After the match, Revolution attacked Hardys as Khoya hit a Sky High to Matt through a table and then Manik tried to hit a frog splash on Jeff through a table but Jeff moved out and Manik crashed through the table. Jeff then climbed to the top of the cage and tried to climb down but Abyss knocked him off and he crotched on the cage door and Storm slammed a cowbell with Jeff's head causing him to fall down onto the steel ring steps.

The match was followed by a brawl between Team Angle (Kurt Angle, Austin Aries and Gunner) and The Beat Down Clan (MVP, Kenny King, Samoa Joe and Low Ki), during which BDC outnumbered Team Angle and injured Gunner's arm.

Next, Awesome Kong took on Havok in a Six Sides of Steel match. Havok began brawling with Kong in the aisle to begin the match. Kong nailed an Awesome Bomb and a diving splash to Havok for the win.

Later, Bobby Roode took on Eric Young in a Six Sides of Steel match. Roode tossed a chair at Young to knock him off the top rope and then repeatedly hit him with the chair and performed a Roode Bomb on Young onto the chair for the win.

It was followed by the penultimate Handicap Six Sides of Steel match, in which Tyrus took on Mark Andrews and Rockstar Spud. Ethan Carter III interfered in the match on Tyrus' behalf by attacking Andrews and Spud, allowing Tyrus to hit a Tongan death grip into a chokeslam on Spud for the win. After the match, EC3 tried to shave Spud's hair but Jeremy Borash cut off the cord of the shaver.

Main event match
The main event was a Lethal Lockdown match between Team Angle (Kurt Angle, Austin Aries, Gunner and Lashley) and Beat Down Clan (MVP, Low Ki, Kenny King and Samoa Joe). Gunner and King were the first two entrants of the match. Low Ki entered next and assisted King in attacking Gunner. Aries would enter next to even the odds. Joe entered as the fifth entrant of the match. Angle entered next who would run right into a hockey stick by Joe. He was followed by MVP, thus completing all the four members of BDC and Team Angle was outnumbered. Lashley would enter next as the final entrant to even the odds for Team Angle. After a back and forth action between the two teams, Lashley hit a spear to MVP for the win.

Results

References

External links
Lockdown 2015

Impact Wrestling Lockdown
2015 in professional wrestling
2015 American television episodes
2010s American television specials
Professional wrestling in New York City
2015 in New York City
January 2015 sports events in the United States
Events in New York City